Carposina glauca is a moth of the family Carposinidae. It was first described by Edward Meyrick in 1913. It is endemic to the Hawaiian island of Oahu.

References

Carposinidae
Endemic moths of Hawaii
Moths described in 1913